Hashemabad (also Romanized as Hāshemābād) is a village in Margavar Rural District, Silvaneh District, Urmia County, West Azerbaijan Province, Iran. At the 2006 census, its population was 1,024, in 184 families.

All the people of the village are Kurds and speak Kurdish. Their main occupation is farming and cattle raising. A river called Barandoz Chay is running by the village. The villagers are Sunni Muslims.

References 

Populated places in Urmia County